Alysa King is a Canadian actress best known for her role in Berkshire County.

Career
King was a child model and actress, she did national commercials for companies such as K-mart and Chrysler.  Her parents withdrew her from professional acting so she could concentrate on school, but she still continued to act in school plays and in local theatre productions. King returned to acting professionally after she completed her post-secondary education.  King is a graduate of Sheridan College's theatre program, she has a Bachelor of Arts in Drama and English and a graduate degree in Education from Queen's University.

King has found success in the horror genre, her most notable roles being Kylie Winters in Berkshire County, Sandy in Bed of the Dead and Rachel Ingram on the television series Slasher.

Filmography

Film

Television

Awards and nominations

External links

References

Actresses from Ontario
Canadian film actresses
Canadian television actresses
Living people
People from Milton, Ontario
Year of birth missing (living people)